John J. Owen (August 27, 1859 – January 25, 1933) was an American Democratic politician who served as a member of the Virginia Senate, representing the state's 28th district.

References

External links

1859 births
1933 deaths
Democratic Party Virginia state senators
20th-century American politicians
People from Prince Edward County, Virginia